Worlds in Collision is the eighth album by American rock group Pere Ubu.  The album continues in the shift away from their more experimental early work to emphasize the relatively conventional pop found on their previous studio album, Cloudland.  For this album, Eric Drew Feldman (Captain Beefheart, Snakefinger, the Residents, the Pixies) takes over from departing original member Allen Ravenstine on synthesizer, though Ravenstine makes some guest appearances.

Track listing
All tracks composed by Pere Ubu (Eric Drew Feldman, Jim Jones, Scott Krauss, Tony Maimone and David Thomas); except where indicated
"Oh Catherine"  – 2:54
"I Hear They Smoke the BBQ"  – 4:08
"Turpentine!"  – 2:40
"Goodnite Irene"  – 4:10
"Mirror Man"  – 3:32
"Cry Cry Cry" (Chris Cutler, Feldman, Jones, Krauss, Maimone, Thomas) – 2:45
"Worlds in Collision"  – 3:43
"Life of Riley"  – 2:34
"Over the Moon"  – 3:08
"Don't Look Back" (Cutler, Feldman, Jones, Krauss, Maimone, Thomas) – 4:05
"Playback"  – 3:30
"Nobody Knows"  – 2:37
"Winter in the Firelands" (Cutler, Feldman, Jones, Krauss, Maimone, Thomas) – 3:09

Personnel
Pere Ubu
David Thomas - vocals
Jim Jones - guitar, backing vocals
Eric Drew Feldman - keyboards, computers, synthesizer
Tony Maimone - bass
Scott Krauss - drums 
with guests:
Allen Ravenstine - EML synthesizer on "Turpentine!", "Life of Riley", "Playback" and "Winter in the Firelands"
Andy Redhead - drums
John Kirkpatrick - melodeon on "Cry Cry Cry", "Worlds in Collision" and "Over the Moon"
Susie Honeyman - violin on "Over The Moon"
Al Clay - backing vocals on "Don't Look Back", "Goodnite Irene", "Nobody Knows", "Over the Moon" and "Worlds in Collision"
Gil Norton - backing vocals

References

Pere Ubu albums
1991 albums
Albums produced by Gil Norton
Fontana Records albums